The 1987–88 Serie A was won by Milan.

Teams
Pescara, Pisa and Cesena had been promoted from Serie B.

Season summary 
The summer of 1987 brought several notable players into the Italian championship: Vincenzo Scifo (for Internazionale), Ian Rush (Juventus), Ruud Gullit and Marco van Basten (Milan). The reigning champions Napoli started well leading the league after five matches. Inter and Juventus had several issues.

Napoli retained top-place in autumn and winter, suffering only one defeat in the first 20 games. In March Napoli began to struggle, and ultimately only won 2 of the 10 remaining fixtures. Milan who had been in second place for much of the season were able to reduce the points deficit with a prolonged undefeated run. Their head-to-head match, played on 1 May 1988, ended in a 3–2 win for Milan putting them 1 point ahead in the title race with two games remaining to play. Milan drew their final games, but Napoli did worse, losing both matches. It led to Milan's 11th title and its first since 1979. This season was the last with 16 teams playing, as two relegations and four promotions from Serie B meant that from 1988–89 their would be 18 clubs in the top flight.

Final classification

Results

UEFA Cup qualification

Juventus qualified for 1988–89 UEFA Cup.

Top goalscorers

See also 
 1987–88 A.C. Milan season

References

Sources

External links

 :it:Classifica calcio Serie A italiana 1989 - Italian version with pictures and info.
 Italy Championship 1987/88 - All results on RSSSF Website.

Serie A seasons
Italy
1987–88 in Italian football leagues